St Sidwell's is an area east of Exeter city centre in the ward of Newtown. Formerly a village in its own right, St Sidwells grew in importance along with Exeter thanks to its location on the main cart track between Exeter and the high ground of Stoke Hill and the rich farmland of East Devon.

History

The springs of St Sidwell's were tapped by the Romans for the needs of the city and their water piped via wooden aqueducts to supply their citadel. This system became the underground passages of the 13th century and was only turned off in 1902. The settlement's current name derives from Saint Sidwell, a devout young girl who was beheaded by her father's farm labourers in fields outside the East gate at a site where a spring was struck and miracles began to occur.

In 1665, St Sidwell's Church of England School was founded  and is still there to this day as a primary school. Children's author Gene Kemp taught at the school in the 1970s.

Geography

St Sidwell's comprises part of Exeter City Centre (Sidwell Street) to the west and a residential area to the east. It is south of Pennsylvania and north of Newtown. Sidwell Street is the main road through the area, which splits into Old Tiverton Road and Blackboy road further east. It is the slightly less upmarket, eastern end of the city centre, and mainly comprises barbers, charity shops and foreign food stores. The nearest railway station is St James Park.

St Sidwell's and St James are names used interchangeably often to describe the same rough geographical area - neither of the two have formal boundaries.

In popular culture
The parish is mentioned in an 1865 edition of Charles Dickens' magazine All the Year Round:

Notable people
British bryologist Frances Elizabeth Tripp was baptised here.

References

Sources
 Evidence Base: Exeter St. James Neighbourhood Plan

 

Areas of Exeter